John Sidney Oliver (1867 – after 1895) was an English professional footballer born in Southwick, Sunderland, who played as a full back. He made 101 appearances in the Football League playing for Sunderland, Middlesbrough Ironopolis and Small Heath.

References
 
 

1867 births
Year of death missing
Footballers from Sunderland
English footballers
Association football fullbacks
Sunderland A.F.C. players
Middlesbrough Ironopolis F.C. players
Birmingham City F.C. players
English Football League players
Date of birth missing
Place of death missing